Julen Urigüen Sieveking (born July 22, 1991 in Guatemala City, Guatemala) is a former professional tennis player who lives in the United States.  He has competed for the Guatemala Davis Cup team.

Early life 
Urigüen started to play tennis when he was 9 years old, choosing to focus on it when he was 11. He became part of the all-Guatemalan junior tennis team in every category.

Junior career 
Urigüen competed at the 2009 Australian Open in the Boys Singles, where he made it to the semi-finals after being seeded second. He lost in the first round at Roland Garros, where he had been seeded fifth.

Urigüen also plays doubles, with Harry Fowler in Australia (seeded 4th, eliminated in the first round) and with Tennys Sandgren at the French Open (seeded 3rd, eliminated first round).

College career 
It was announced in April 2009 that he had signed to play with the University of Virginia Cavaliers men's tennis team. He  graduated in 2013.

References

External links
 
 

1991 births
Living people
Guatemalan expatriates in the United States
Guatemalan male tennis players
Sportspeople from Guatemala City
Virginia Cavaliers men's tennis players